William Allen Fincher (May 26, 1894 – May 7, 1946) was a Major League Baseball pitcher who played for the St. Louis Browns in . In 1946, Fincher committed suicide with a pistol in Shreveport, Louisiana.

References

External links
Baseball Reference.com

1894 births
1946 deaths
St. Louis Browns players
Major League Baseball pitchers
Baseball players from Georgia (U.S. state)
Little Rock Travelers players
Memphis Chickasaws players
Portland Beavers players
San Antonio Bronchos players
San Antonio Bears players
Galveston Pirates players
Omaha Buffaloes players
Galveston Sand Crabs players
Wichita Falls Spudders players
New Orleans Pelicans (baseball) players
Suicides by firearm in Louisiana